Needham is a small village in Norfolk, England.

Its church, St Peter, is one of 124 existing round-tower churches in Norfolk.

References in popular culture
 The television series The West Wing had a recurring character named, "Lord John Marbury, Earl of Croy, Marquess of Needham and Dolby, Baronet of Brycey."

Notes

External links

Village's local newspaper website
St Peter's on the European Round Tower Churches website
Diss Express 

Villages in Norfolk
Civil parishes in Norfolk